The FBW 91U EU4A is a bus of the Swiss manufacturer Franz Brozincevic Wetzikon (FBW), from  Wetzikon.

History and development
The FBW 91U EU4A is a left-steered bus type used by various regional bus / transport companies in Switzerland. The body is from Hess. The FBW 91U EU4A has a luggage compartment, which is located directly behind the rear exit door and has a partition with a sliding door with glass panes. There are also seats in the luggage compartment.
In the Zugerland transport companies ZVB  (German: Zugerland Verkehrsbetrieben), these buses were mainly used on the mountain lines Zug-Ägeri (line 1) and Zug-Menzingen (line 2).
The ZVB buses were also equipped with split dispenser in front of the rear wheels in order to achieve better grip on snow and ice. These are as pure buses, as buses with the passenger trailer APE 4.80 or with the passenger trailer APE 4.80 and the luggage trailer AGP 3. These trailer were used already from the predecessor model the Saurer 5 DUK. With the purchase in 1975, together with the orange buses, which were held in VST unit paintwork, new ordered APE 4.80 trailers got also the orange paintwork. An FBW 91U EU4A of the ZVB is located in the Zug depot technology history (German: Zuger Depot Technikgeschichte).

Data

Pictures

References
Zuger Depot Technikgeschichte
 Sandro Sigrist: Elektrische Strassenbahnen im Kanton Zug. Prellbock, Leissigen 1997, 

Articulated buses
Full-size buses
Transport in the canton of Zug